Héctor Urrego (born 5 February 1945) is a former Colombian cyclist. He competed in the men's sprint at the 1968 Summer Olympics.

References

1945 births
Living people
Colombian male cyclists
Olympic cyclists of Colombia
Cyclists at the 1968 Summer Olympics
Sportspeople from Bogotá
20th-century Colombian people